This article details the Warrington Wolves Rugby League Football Club's 2010 season. This is the clubs fifteenth season of the Super League era. The club will also look to defend the Challenge Cup following victory at Wembley Stadium against Huddersfield Giants in August 2009.

Pre Season

The Wolves played three pre-season fixtures in total. The traditional Boxing Day fixture with rivals Widnes Vikings was postponed first on 26 December 2009 and then on 3 January 2010 due to the pitch being frozen. No further dates were attempted for this fixture. The Wolves first pre-season fixture saw them travel for the first time to Leigh Sports Village to face Leigh Centurions on 17 January 2010. The Wolves ran out 16–60 victors on the day. The club then travelled to Derwent Park to face Workington Town on 23 January 2010 in a game that helped raise funds for the area following the floods earlier this year. Warrington sent the Under 21s team but still had enough strength to record a 12–34 victory against the semi-professionals from Cumbria.  Warrington's final warm up fixture was for Paul Wood's Testimonial and take place at Halliwell Jones Stadium on 27 January 2010 against Super League rivals Wigan Warriors. Wigan stole the show and recorded a 12–20 victory, this being the Warriors first ever victory at the new home of the Wolves since 2003.

Super League

Table

Matches

Challenge Cup

Super League XV Play Offs

2010 Squad
As of 27 November 2009:

2010 Transfers In/Out

In

Out

References

Warrington Wolves seasons
Warrington Wolves